Georgian Jews are a community of Jews who migrated to Georgia during the Babylonian captivity in the 6th century BCE. It is one of the oldest communities in that land.

Prior to Georgia's annexation by the Russian Empire in 1801, the 2,600-year history of the Georgian Jews was marked by an almost total absence of antisemitism and a visible assimilation in the Georgian language and culture. The Georgian Jews were considered ethnically and culturally distinct from neighboring Mountain Jews. They were also traditionally a highly separate group from the Ashkenazi Jews in Georgia, who arrived following the Russian annexation of Georgia.

As a result of a major emigration wave in the 1990s, the vast majority of Georgian Jews now live in Israel, with the world's largest community living in the city of Ashdod.

History
The Georgian Jews traditionally lived separately, not only from the surrounding Georgian people, but also from the Ashkenazi Jews in Tbilisi, who had different practices and language.

The community, which numbered almost 60,000 as recently as the 1970s, has largely emigrated to Israel, the United States, the Russian Federation and Belgium (in Antwerp). , only about 1,500 Georgian Jews remained in Georgia. According to the 2002 First General National Census of Georgia, there are 3,541 Jewish believers in the country. For example, the Lezgishvili branch of Georgian Jews have families in Israel, Moscow, Baku, Düsseldorf, and Cleveland, Ohio (US). Several hundred Georgian Jewish families live in the New York tri-state area, particularly in New York City and Long Island.

Origins
Georgian-speaking Jewry is one of the oldest surviving Jewish communities in the world. The Georgian Jews have an approximately 2,600-year history in Colchis. The origin of Georgian Jews, also known as Gurjim or kartveli ebraelebi, is debated. The most popular view is that the first Jews made their way to southern Georgia after Nebuchadnezzar's conquest of Jerusalem in 586 BCE and exile in Babylon. This claim is supported by the medieval Georgian historical account by Leonti Mroveli, who writes:

Mroveli added that a further settlement of the Jews in Georgia was during the Roman period of Emperor Vespasian. He wrote that Jews lived in Georgia long before 1st century CE. According to Mroveli:

The ancient Georgian historic chronicle, The Conversion of Kartli, is the oldest and only Georgian source concerning the history of the Jewish community in Georgia. The chronicle describes a version similar to that offered centuries later by Leonti Mroveli, but the period of Jewish migration into Georgia is ascribed to Alexander the Great:

Georgian sources also refer to the arrival of the first Jews in Western Georgia from the Byzantine Empire during the 6th century CE. Approximately 3,000 of the Jews fled to Eastern Georgia, which by that time was controlled by the Persians, to escape severe persecution by the Byzantines. The existence of the Jews in these regions during this period is supported by the archaeological evidence, which shows that Jews lived in Mtskheta, the ancient capital of the Eastern Georgian state of Iberia-Kartli.

According to the Georgian hagiography, Jewish communities existed in Georgia in the 1st century. A Georgian Jew called Elias was said to be in Jerusalem during the Crucifixion and brought Jesus' robe back with him to Georgia. He had acquired it from a Roman soldier at Golgotha.

The Jews spoke Georgian, and later Jewish traders developed a dialect called Kivruli, or Judaeo-Georgian, which included a number of Hebrew words.

In the second half of the 7th century, the Muslim Empire conquered extensive Georgian territory, which became a province of the Arab caliphate. Arab emirs ruled in the Georgian capital Tbilisi and surrounding territory for nearly 500 years, until 1122.

Genetic studies carried out on Georgian Jews as part of a wider survey showed close genetic links with other Jews, and in particular with Iraqi and Persian Jews. This seemed to prove the historical accounts of Jewish migration from Persia into Georgia.

Middle Ages

There is not much documentation about Georgian Jews under the Arab domination. In the late 9th century, Abu-Imran Musa al-Za'farani (later known as Abu-Imran al-Tiflisi) founded a Jewish Karai sect called the Tiflis Sect ("Tiflisites"), which lasted for more than 300 years. The sect deviated from Rabbinic halakhah in its marriage and kashrut customs. This sect did not represent the great majority of Georgian Jews, who adhered to traditional Rabbinic Judaism while maintaining strong religious ties with Baghdad and other Jews of Iraq. The nature of Georgian Jew's observance to rabbinic law was also noted by Benjamin of Tudela and Abraham ben David (also known as the RABAD or RAVAD).

The Mongols swept through Georgia in 1236, prompting many of the Jews of Eastern and Southern Georgia to move to the western region, which remained independent. There they formed small communities along the Black Sea, and eventually their poverty forced them into serfdom. For 500 years, beginning in the end of the 14th century, the Jews of Georgia belonged to the kamani, or serf class, under the Georgian elite.

Their situation worsened in the 15th and 16th centuries due to constant military conflicts and invasions by Timur, Ottoman Empire, and Muslim Persia. By the end of the 15th century, Georgia had fragmented into three separate kingdoms and five feudal territories. Jewish serfs were sold from master to master as a family or individuals as debt payments or gifts. The Jewish communities were torn apart and Jewish communal life was nearly impossible to maintain. Isolation and lack of a religious and spiritual center led to a decline of Jewish knowledge.

An endless string of wars and rebellions characterized the late 18th and early 19th centuries as a result of Russian interference to the region, leaving the region decimated. Jewish property was often confiscated and Jews were forced to seek the protection of the local feudal lords. Instead of finding security, many Jews became enslaved by these lords. The serfs, including Jewish ones, were divided into three categories according to Georgian law: the King's serfs, Feudal serfs, and the Church's serfs.

During this period, large migrations of Jews took place, either voluntary or forced. In the 15th and 16th centuries, a large number of Jews left for [missing word; maybe Persia?], and many Jews in that region are still of Georgian descent. In the 17th and 18th centuries, tens of thousands of Jewish and non-Jewish Georgians were forcibly relocated to Persia by the Islamic Persian invaders.

Georgian annexation into the Russian Empire

In 1801, the Russian Empire annexed Eastern Georgia. The King's serfs became the Treasury's serfs, and were obliged to pay taxes to the Tsar. In 1835 there were 1,363 Jews with 113 Karaites living in the town of Kutais (Kutaisi) and its surroundings, 1,040 in Gori, 623 in Akhaltsikhe, and 61 in Tiflis (Tbilisi). The total Jewish population of Georgia and the region beyond the Caucasus was 12,234.

In 1863–71, the Russian authorities abolished serfdom, and Jewish former serfs moved to towns and villages where free Jews were already settled. Finally the Jews of Georgia began to develop Jewish communities.  Each group moved together to the same towns and established their own respective synagogues. They were usually made up of a number of extended family groups spanning three or four generations. Each community had a gabbai who served as a rabbi, shohet, mohel, and Cheder, and oversaw religious and communal affairs. These small communities developed into the Jewish quarter of their particular towns.

In the beginning of the 19th century, certain Ashkenazi Russian Jews moved to Georgia. The Ashkenazi Jews and the Georgian Jews began establishing contact with each other, but relations were strained. Georgian Jews viewed the Ashkenazim as godless and secular, while the Ashkenazim looked down on the Georgian Jews.

Zionism was a uniting cause for the two groups.  Ashkenazim joined Zionist organizations and began to spread their ideas to the Georgian Jewish communities. In 1897, the first Zionist organization was established in Tbilisi. On 20 August 1901, the First Congress of Caucasus Zionists was held in Tbilisi. Rabbi David Baazov led Georgian Zionism during the late 19th and early 20th centuries. In 1903, Baazov attended the Sixth Zionist Congress in Basel, Switzerland. In 1918, the All-Jewish Congress in Tbilisi took place and included representatives from every Georgian and Russian Jewish community in the country.

Beginning in 1863, groups of Jews began making aliyah, mostly for religious reasons. By 1916, 439 Georgian Jews lived in Ottoman Palestine, mostly in Jerusalem near the Damascus Gate. Most Jews who made aliyah were poor and worked as freight-handlers in Jerusalem. Other more prominent Georgian Jews served as financiers and carpet merchants. Prominent Georgian Jewish families in the holy land before 1948 were the Dabra (Davarashvili) and Kokia (Kakiashvili) families.

Anti-Semitism under the Tsarist government
The tradition of the relationship between Jews and other Georgians has no signs of anti-Semitism, excluding the Tsarist government. For many centuries, the Church in Georgia did not incite against the Jews, and the Georgian Jews were visibly assimilated in the country's rural life and culture.

In the second half of the 19th century, there were some outbreaks of anti-Semitic acts, perhaps stemming from the influence of the Russian Orthodox Church. Anti-Semitism was supplemented by the end of serfdom and the urbanization of the Jewish population. As Jews became traders instead of field hands, Georgian workers began to see them as competitors and economic threats. Anti-Semitism had been active in Russia for centuries and, under the annexation, began to influence non-Jews in Georgia.

Six blood libels have been recorded as having taken place in Georgia. The first blood libel was in Surami in 1850. A little boy from Gori disappeared while on a visit with his parents. The child was found dead after four days, and the Jews were blamed for his death. The guberniya doctor examined the dead child and concluded that he was drowned. The people blamed the Jews and started riots against the Jews. Only the intervention of the head of the Viceroyalty avoided more problems.

The worst and most infamous case was in the village of Sachkhere in 1878, when nine Jews were accused of partaking in the ritual killing of a Christian child to use the blood to make matzah for Passover. The highly publicized trial occurred in Kutaisi, and was called the Kutaisi Trial. The accused were found not guilty, but the blood libels continued.

Revolution and independence

After the October 1917 Russian Revolution threw out the Tsar's government and replaced it with the Bolsheviks, Georgians clamored for independence from their occupiers. On 26 May 1918, the Georgian Republic declared its independence. With independence came freedom of speech, press, and organization, which improved the economic situation of the Jews of Georgia. This newfound freedom did not last long. The Red Army invaded Georgia in February 1921, prompting a mass exodus from the region. Approximately 1,500–2,000 Jews left Georgia: 1,000–1,200 settled in the Land of Israel, the remainder fled mainly to Istanbul, where a Georgian Jewish community had been in existence since the 1880s.

Initially, the Soviets allowed the Jews to maintain their religious customs, but after a Georgian rebellion in 1924, the Bolshevik government terminated all Zionist activity, imposed economic restrictions, and generally discriminated against the Jewish community.  As a result, many Jewish businesses were bankrupted and 200 families applied for exit visas. Only 18 were allowed to emigrate. 

In the mid-1920s, the Soviets focused on industrializing and secularizing the Jews of Georgia. Mass numbers of Jews were forced to work in factories or to join craft cooperatives and collective farm projects. In 1927–1928, OZET, the organization for settling Jewish workers on farms, established a number of Jewish collective farms. These small homogeneous communities became isolated Jewish communities where Jewish learning was continued. Recognizing this, the Communists disbanded the communities in the 1930s, scattering the Jews among various farms and destroying Jewish communal life. 

Meanwhile, blood libels continued in full force, with occurrences in Sachkhere in 1921, Tbilisi in 1923, and Akhaltsikhe in 1926.

Due to Soviet persecution and the declining economic situation, Zionist leaders focused on increasing aliyah efforts. The Soviets firmly opposed Jewish emigration and, during the 1930s, cracked down on Zionist organizations, arresting or murdering many members. In 1937–38, the authorities stifled participation in Jewish religious services or cultural activities. In September 1937, nine hakhams, two of whom were Ashkenazi, were arrested in Tskhinvali (Staliniri at the time), and sent to prison without trial and murdered.

The only surviving Jewish institution was the History and Ethnography Museum, but it too was soon closed down. Its director, Aharon Krikheli was arrested in 1948, and the museum closed in the early 1950s, thus signifying the annihilation of Jewish culture in Georgia, which the Soviets had built up during the prewar years.

Contemporary Georgia

During World War II, thousands of Georgian Jews served in the Red Army. After the war, the authorities arrested Jews and closed or destroyed synagogues, and anti-Semitic acts of violence erupted. But despite their attempts, the Soviets could not completely annihilate the practice of Judaism and, even in the late 1960s and 1970s, most Georgian Jews managed to observe their traditions. Georgian Jews were able to preserve their identity better than Jews in European parts of the Soviet Union, and assimilated and intermarried less. Throughout Soviet rule, Jews remained society's scapegoat. They made up the majority of Georgians convicted for economic crimes, and were punished more severely than the rest of the population. Blood libels continued with incidents in Tskhaltubo in 1963, Zestafoni in 1964, and Kutaisi in 1965.

After the Six-Day War, huge numbers of Soviet Jews began protesting for the right to immigrate to Israel, and many applied for exit visas. Georgian Jews made up a large percentage of this number. They were among the first to begin protesting, and were among the most militant of campaigners. In August 1969, eighteen families wrote to the Human Rights Commission of the United Nations demanding permission to make aliyah. This was the first public insistence by Soviet Jews for immigration to Israel. The Israeli government and the Jewish world campaigned heavily on behalf of the plight of the Soviet Jewry. In July 1971, a group of Georgian Jews went on a hunger strike outside a Moscow post office. The determination of Soviet Jewish activists and international pressure led the Soviets to lessen their harsh anti-Jewish policies. During the 1970s, the Soviets permitted limited Jewish emigration to Israel, and about 30,000 Georgian Jews made aliyah, with thousands of others leaving for other countries. Approximately 17% of the Soviet Jewish population emigrated at this time. In 1979, the Jewish population in Georgia was 28,300 and, by 1989, it had decreased to 24,800.

While most Soviet Jewish emigration was individual, Georgian-Jewish emigration was communal. Due to Georgian-Jewish traditions of strong, extended families and the strict, patriarchal nature of Georgian families, Georgians immigrated as whole communities, with emigration of individuals causing a chain reaction leading to more emigration, and brought their community structures with them. For example, nearly the entire population of at least two Georgian towns made aliyah. At the time the emigration started, Israel had a policy of scattering the population around the country, and was experiencing a housing shortage, with the result that Georgians were assigned housing in different parts of the country. The Georgians began demanding that they be concentrated together, and the crisis reached a fever pitch when several families threatened to return to Georgia, and new immigrants, forewarned by predecessors, began demanding to be placed in specific areas upon arrival. Although Prime Minister Golda Meir criticized the Georgians' desire to "isolate themselves into ghettos", the Israeli Immigrant Absorption Ministry eventually bowed to their demands, and began to create concentrations of around 200 families in twelve areas of the country.

In Israel, Georgian immigrants successfully integrated into society, but faced certain problems. Georgian immigrants were usually able to find jobs with ease, and often worked in light industry jobs, such as dock workers, porters, and construction workers, but faced certain issues. One major issue was religion; the Georgian Jews were often devout and had fiercely clung to their traditions in the Soviet Union, and were stunned to discover that Israeli Jews were mostly secular. As a result, Georgian immigrants demanded their own separate synagogues to continue their unique religious traditions, which the government agreed to, and enrolled their children in religious schools rather than regular schools.

Independence and Georgia today

After the fall of the Soviet Union, Georgia declared her independence in 1991. Since independence, the country faced continuous military conflict, leaving the region in political and economic turmoil.

The situation of the Jewish community of Georgia improved dramatically due to the end of the Soviet occupation. In 1994, President Shevardnadze issued a decree to protect Jewish religious, cultural and historic monuments. In addition, the Jews of Georgia have successfully maintained their Jewish identity and traditions despite the oppression they faced under the Soviets. Intermarriage has always been low and levels of Jewish knowledge are significantly higher than those of other CIS republics.

In 1990, the Rachamim Society was established, which supplies financial and medical support to the Jews of Tbilisi and maintains Jewish cemeteries and synagogues. It functions as an umbrella organization for Ashkenazi Jews. The Association of Georgian Jews (Derekh Yehudi) focuses on regaining Jewish property confiscated during the Soviet era. The Jewish community still faces acts of violence and obstacles in the return of property rights to a 19th-century Ashkenazi synagogue stolen by the Soviets. The Chief Rabbi of Georgia from Chabad Lubavitsch is Rabbi Avraham Michaelshvili, who has been there since the early 1990s hosting the Georgian community and many guests. There was a further Chief Rabbi Ariel Levin. Levine returned to Israel. His role was taken over by the Vaad l’Hatzolas Nidchei Yisroel affiliated Rabbi Avimelech Rosenblath. There is no umbrella organization for all Jews in Georgia, but more than 30 Jewish institutions are in existence, in addition to one Jewish day school and four supplementary schools. Three Jewish newspapers are published - Menora, Shalom, and 26 Century, and there is also a Jewish radio and television station.

The Jewish population of Georgia has steadily decreased over the years due to aliyah in response to the political and economic issues since independence. Overall, since 1989, 21,134 Jews have moved to Israel. Once numbering as many as 100,000, today the Georgian Jewish population is approximately 13,000. Tbilisi has the largest Jewish population at 11,000 out of 1.5 million. Jewish communities are located in Tbilisi, Kutaisi, Batumi, Oni, Akhaltsikhe, Akhalkalaki, Surami, Kareli, and Stalin's hometown of Gori, and synagogues are located in most of these cities. The provinces of Abkhazia and South Ossetia are virtually devoid of Jews due to the military conflicts in these areas. Many Abkhazian Jews emigrated to Israel from Abkhazia during the war in the 1990s there, while the few who stayed are mostly elderly. A synagogue is still active in Sukhumi. There is one Jew left in South Ossetia (see articles History of the Jews in Abkhazia and History of the Jews in South Ossetia).

In January 2001, in a first step toward establishing relations, the Georgian Orthodox Church and the Jewish community of Georgia signed a cooperation agreement of mutual respect and support. Relations between Georgia and Israel are warm, however. The Israeli embassy is located in Tbilisi and also serves Armenia; the Georgian embassy is in Tel Aviv. Israel has supplied humanitarian aid to Georgia a number of times, including drought assistance and aid for earthquake victims.

The Jewish Agency for Israel (JAFI) and American Jewish Joint Distribution Committee (JDC) both have permanent representatives in Georgia. JDC and Hesed Eliyahu distribute food and medical aid to the Jewish elderly, who make up more than 50% of the Georgian Jewish community.

As a result of the 2008 South Ossetia War, some 200 Georgian Jews immigrated to Israel with assistance from the Jewish Agency. During that war, the Jewish Quarter of Tskhinvali was destroyed during the Battle of Tskhinvali.

Demographics
According to the 1897 Russian Empire Census, there were 12,194 people whose native language was "Jewish" in the two provinces that largely covered today's Georgia: Tiflis Governorate (5,188) and Kutais Governorate (7,006). There were 3,419 Jews in Kutaisi city (10.5% of the population), 2,935 in Tiflis, 1,064 in Batumi.

Georgia's population almost doubled between 1926 and 1970, then began declining, with dramatic declines in the 1970s and 1990s, when many Georgian Jews left and moved to other countries, especially to Israel.

Language
The traditional language of the Georgian Jews is Judaeo-Georgian, a variant of Georgian, characterized by a large number of Hebrew loanwords, and written using either the Georgian alphabet or Hebrew alphabet. Besides speaking Judaeo-Georgian, the Georgian Jews speak the languages of the peoples surrounding them.  In Georgia, these include Georgian and Russian; in Belgium, Dutch; in the United States and Canada English; and in Israel, Hebrew.

Aliyah and diaspora outside of Georgia

Many Georgian Jews now live in Israel. In the United States, the principal Georgian Jewish synagogue is the Congregation of Georgian Jews in the Forest Hills section of Queens, New York City. In Belgium, most Georgian Jews are member of the Antwerp Jewish community.

The main Georgian synagogue in Belgium is on Isabellalei in Antwerpen, and is led by rabbi Avishalom Kalazan of Yemenite origin. Most of the community is engaged in jewelry trade, with the new generation going into more diverse directions. A second Georgian Jewish synagogue became active around year 2012 under leadership of rabbi Yitzhak Pichkhadze.

One notable Georgian Jew in USA is Tamir Sapir, born Temur Sepiashvili, an immigrant taxi driver turned businessman from New York. Another notable Georgian Jew is Dr. Yuri Busi (born Yuri Busiashvili), who was known for being the physician for the actress Lucille Ball. Dr. Busi developed a successful career as a Cardiologist serving mostly the emigrant Soviet community in Los Angeles.

In Israel, most Georgian Jews settled near the coast in cities such as Lod, Bat Yam, Ashdod, and Holon. There are Georgian Jews in Jerusalem as well, with several prominent synagogues. This trend of concentrated communities of Georgian Jews in Israel has changed and the population is much more integrated now, is more homogeneously dispersed in the country, and is now successfully integrated in every sphere of the society.

See also 
Georgia–Israel relations

References

Resource
Caucasus article in the Jewish Encyclopedia

External links
World Congress of Georgian Jews
Way of life and customs by Rachel Arbel and Lili Magal from World Congress of Georgian Jews
WATCH: Forget Atlanta - this is the Georgia on my mind, Haaretz

 
Jewish ethnic groups